Serranobatrachus sanctaemartae is a species of frog in the family Strabomantidae. It is endemic to the Sierra Nevada de Santa Marta, northern Colombia. Its natural habitats are tropical moist montane forests and rivers. It is threatened by habitat loss.

References

Amphibians of Colombia
Endemic fauna of Colombia
Taxa named by Alexander Grant Ruthven
Amphibians described in 1917
Taxonomy articles created by Polbot